Nothroctenus is a genus of South American wandering spiders first described by H. D. Badcock in 1932.

Species
 it contains nine species in Brazil, Paraguay, and Bolivia:
Nothroctenus bahiensis Mello-Leitão, 1936 – Brazil
Nothroctenus fuxico Dias & Brescovit, 2004 – Brazil
Nothroctenus lineatus (Tullgren, 1905) – Bolivia
Nothroctenus marshi (F. O. Pickard-Cambridge, 1897) – Brazil, Paraguay, Bolivia
Nothroctenus m. pygmaeus (Strand, 1909) – Brazil
Nothroctenus omega (Mello-Leitão, 1929) – Brazil
Nothroctenus sericeus (Mello-Leitão, 1929) – Brazil
Nothroctenus spinulosus (Mello-Leitão, 1929) – Brazil
Nothroctenus stupidus Badcock, 1932 (type) – Paraguay

References

Araneomorphae genera
Ctenidae
Spiders of South America